Neuland Colony (Plautdietsch: Nielaunt /ˈnilɔnt/) is a Mennonite settlement in Paraguay. After thousands of Plautdietsch-speaking Russian Mennonites fled the Soviet Union during the Great Trek of World War II, many were left displaced by the war. In response to this need, land in Boquerón Department was purchased by the Mennonite Central Committee in 1947 and settled by these same Mennonite refugees from Europe.  As of 2008 the colony had about 3,400 residents.

The site is near Filadelfia, the capital of Boquerón, and not far from neighbouring Presidente Hayes Department. Neuland is within the Gran Chaco and hosts among other things a museum of colonisation history and a monument remembering the Chaco War.

The monthly newspaper, Neuland – Informiert und Diskutiert, is one of several German language newspapers in Paraguay.

Etymology
Its name means "New Land", was founded by settlers of German origin, is the youngest of the Mennonite colonies.

Climate

The climate is tropical, with a maximum of 45 degrees Celsius in summer, and a minimum of 9 degrees Celsius in winter. The average is 25 degrees. It presents long drought followed by torrential rains.

Geography

Plain that does not exceed 300 meters above sea level. There are sporadic undulations which are fertile land for agriculture and animal husbandry.

It is close to Filadelfia, the capital of Boquerón Department, and not far from the neighborhood of Presidente Hayes. Neuland falls within the Gran Chaco.

History and tourism

It has a Museum of the History of Colonization, and a reminder of the Monument Chaco War (1932–1935).

The monthly Neuland informiert und diskutiert is one of several German-language newspapers in Paraguay.
In the month of May is the Rodeo Neuland.

The Professional School Neuland has support from the Ministry of Agriculture of Bavaria, Germany in the place many technicians are trained subsequently apply their knowledge in the region.

The district is the Fort Boquerón, which book the first decisive battle of the Chaco War, September 29, 1932. A statue, designed by Hermann Guggiari stands in the place. You can also appreciate the beginnings of the colony and the work of the first settlers of Neuland.

The Public Relations Department of Cooperative Neuland is developing a program of educational tourism, so as to show the ethnic interaction, where the battles erupted in the Chaco War, nature reserves, flora and fauna of the region, Stays the locals, among other attractions of tourist interest. Tourists can see in the visit to the placement and nature reserves the rich and diverse flora and fauna of Chaco.

The ecosystem of Chaco is very sensitive so a mass tourism is not recommended, recommended making ecotourism as a matter of education.

The Amistad Park, is kept in the same conditions as was the Chaco 60 years ago.

The Cooperative Neuland, conscious of the growing tourist interest that awakens the area and recognizing the importance of improving the infrastructure to receive tourists, looking steadily implement projects attraction.

Transportation

It reaches Lagerenza by a detour of route PY09, aka Ruta Transchaco, until Cruce Pioneros at km 413 and thence by a road in very good condition.

Education and culture

In Neuland is very important to culture and education, music  and song stand out among the major art forms, the prestigious Youth Symphony Orchestra musicians has instructed by international artists. In 1993 he created the music education center which is responsible for the instruction to future musicians, essays and presentations of works: classical music, people of different cultures that converge in the region.

Joy Choir is made up of people with certain ailments or shortly integrated into society, in addition to seniors, is like a therapy and as a distraction. In hospitals with patients in difficult situations the chorus becomes an incentive, the same was formed on the recommendation of doctors Hospital Neuland.

Another major concern for Neuland is education. The first settlers, before building their houses, prioritized education, often classes were in the shade of trees, for the settlers, education is the best investment we can make.

As for infrastructure, institutions of primary and secondary education have modern classrooms, laboratories and workshops for practice and testing. Education is compulsory until ninth grade. Students from schools and colleges in villages and the town centre with a school bus managed by the Cooperative.

Regarding university education, the Cooperative award scholarships for study in Asuncion or abroad to persons who have completed their university studies with an undertaking that when completed will give the community their work as development assistance for all.

The training is also an important aspect for Neuland, have been set up vocational training institutions, where they are farmers, tamberos, farmers, carpenters, mechanics, secretaries, accountants and others, and teacher training, where prospective teachers are prepared, subsequently can teach in primary schools in the country.

Economy

After several drawbacks Neuland has become a thriving community and beautiful
It is an agricultural area, are grown peanuts, cotton, sorghum and sesame. It is also an important area of livestock production, cattle for meat and dairy production.

Health

At the hospital, Concordia Neuland are with modern equipment and operating rooms, pharmacy and ambulance to the total provision of doctors.

For the partners of the Cooperative exists the possibility of joining a box hospital as health insurance. The hospital has guards standing to care for patients.

They develop guidance activities in health, education, family, spirituality and services to disabled, orphans, adolescents and sick.

Due to the progress of the Mennonite colony, there was migration of the indigenous population to the colonies, where they receive education, medical care and economic orientation.

References

World Gazeteer: Paraguay – World-Gazetteer.com 
 Geography Illustrated Paraguay, Distributed Arami SRL, 2007. 
 Geography of Paraguay, First Edition 1999, Publisher Hispanic Paraguay SRL

External links

 Neuland
Neuland Colony (Boquerón Department, Paraguay) at Global Anabaptist Mennonite Encyclopedia Online
Pictures of Neuland and the Gran Chaco

Populated places in the Boquerón Department
Mennonitism in Paraguay
Populated places established in 1947
1947 establishments in Paraguay
Russian Mennonite diaspora in South America